Sorel is a commune in the Somme department in Hauts-de-France in northern France.

Geography

Population

History
The village was completely rebuilt after the devastation wrought by World War I. During the 1920s, architect Louis Faille, originally from Nurlu, was responsible for the reconstruction, notably the ‘mairie-école’ (combined mayor's office and school) and the church, completed in 1932.

See also
Communes of the Somme department

References

External links

 Official website of the Communauté de communes 

Communes of Somme (department)